Arases is a genus of butterflies in the family Lycaenidae. 

Lycaenidae
Lycaenidae genera